Fong Ma Po is a village in Lam Tsuen, Tai Po District, Hong Kong.

Fong Ma Po is a Punti village, where a Tin Hau Temple and the Lam Tsuen wishing trees are located.

Administration
Fong Ma Po is a recognized village under the New Territories Small House Policy.

References

External links

 Delineation of area of existing village Fong Ma Po (Tai Po) for election of resident representative (2019 to 2022)

Villages in Tai Po District, Hong Kong
Lam Tsuen